Signalness may refer to:

Signalness Creek, Pope County, Minnesota
Signalness Lake, Pope County, Minnesota